Alvik is a residential district in western Stockholm municipality and part of the Bromma borough. 

The Alvik outdoor Metro station in adjacent Traneberg was opened in 1952 and is also a connection to the Tvärbanan light railway and the Nockeby tramline.

See also
08 Stockholm Human Rights
Alvik metro station

Districts of Stockholm

Districts in Västerort